Carolyn Lieba Francois Lazard (born 1987) is an American artist based in Philadelphia, Pennsylvania. Lazard uses the experience of chronic illness to examine concepts of intimacy and the labor of living involved with chronic illnesses. Lazard expresses their ideas through a variety of mediums including performance, filmmaking, sculpture, writing, photography, sound; as well as environments and installations. Lazard is a 2019 Pew Foundation Fellow and one of the first recipients of The Ford Foundation's 2020 Disability Futures Fellows Awards.

Early life and education 
Carolyn Lieba Francois Lazard was born in 1987 in Upland, California.

Lazard graduated with a B.A. degree in 2010 from Bard College. They earned their MFA degree in 2019 from the University of Pennsylvania.

Art career 
Lazard's work has been exhibited internationally including at the Kunsthal Aaruhs, Denmark; Stedelijk Museum, Amsterdam; and The Camden Art Centre, London. Nationally, they have exhibited at the Institute of Contemporary Art, Philadelphia; Walker Art Center, Minneapolis; New Museum, New York; and had screenings at the Anthology Film Archives, New York. Lazard was included in the 2019 Whitney Biennial, curated by Rujeko Hockley and Jane Panetta. Lazard was a participant alongside 75 other artists including fellow Philadelphia-based artist Tiona Nekkia McClodden. Lazard's published works include a 2019 work commissioned by Recess titled Accessibility in the Arts: A Promise and a Practice and The World is Unknown, published by Triple Canopy as a part of their Immaterial Literature project area.

In 2019, Lazard co-organized the ''I Wanna Be With You Everywhere'' festival celebrating disability arts in New York City.

One of Lazard's works, Support System (For Park, Tina, and Bob), 2016, was featured on the cover of Art Papers' winter 2018/2019 edition. The work documents a 12-hour performance completed by the artist where they spent the day in bed. For the 2017 New Museum exhibition "Trigger: Gender as a Tool and a Weapon" Lazard installed A Conspiracy (2017), 12 white-noise machines (the sort used in therapists' offices) installed in one of the elevators.

Their installation from the 2019 Whitney Biennial is titled “Extended Stay”. For this installation, Lazard attached a TV on a hospital mount that extended from the wall. The TV was connected to a cable set to change channels every 30 seconds. The goal of this work was to connect regular museum goers to people with chronic illness and create a shared experience between the two. There is also a connection to the pandemic. The installation brings to light a sense of boredom that people with chronic illness have experienced their entire life that many other only began to experience during the pandemic.

Canaries collective 
Alongside their studio practice they are a co-founder of Canaries, with Jesse Cohen and Bonnie Swencionis. Canaries is a network of cis women, trans people, and non-binary people living and working with autoimmune conditions and other chronic illnesses to create work. The members are artists, painters, actors, and writers who all experience bodily phenomena outside the frame of biomedical discourse. The group, originally based in New York City, has taken the form of a listserve, an art collective, and a support group with regular meetings. As a collective they have exhibited at Recess, New York; Elizabeth Foundation for the Arts, New York; and Franklin Street Works, Connecticut.

Artistic practice 
In March 2017, Lazard co-signed an open letter written by Hannah Black demanding the Whitney Biennial remove the Open Casket painting by Dana Schutz. In 2021, the Pew Center for Arts asked Lazard to cite a queer work that shaped their practice, Lazard named Artist Panteha Abareshi's video work, For Medical Use Only (2019).

Exhibitions 
2016 – Anthology Film Archives, New York City
2017 – Trigger: Gender as a Tool and a Weapon, New Museum, New York City
2018 – Crip Time, Stedelijk Museum, Amsterdam, NL
2018 – Post Institutional Stress Disorder 2, Kunsthal Aarhus, Germany
2018 – A Recipe for Disaster, Camden Art Centre, London, UK
2018 – the Kitchen, New York City
2018 – epigenetic, Shoot the Lobster, New York City
2018 – Essex Street Gallery, New York City
2019 – Walker Art Center, Minneapolis, MN
2020 – SYNC, Essex Street Gallery, New York City
2022 – Walker Art Center, Minneapolis, MN

References

External links
 Carolyn Lazard – Contemporary Art Daily
Artist's Website 
Canaries

1987 births
Living people
21st-century American artists
Artists with disabilities
American people with disabilities
21st-century American women artists
People with Crohn's disease
People with ankylosing spondylitis
Bard College alumni
University of Pennsylvania alumni
21st-century American sculptors
American filmmakers